A. F. M. Akhtaruddin (born 1 January 1968) is a former Bangladeshi cricket umpire. He stood in two Test matches between 2001 and 2002 and in 16 ODI games between 2001 and 2006.

See also
 List of Test cricket umpires
 List of One Day International cricket umpires

References

1968 births
Living people
People from Rajshahi District
Bangladeshi Test cricket umpires
Bangladeshi One Day International cricket umpires